Marisa Laurito (born 19 April 1951) is an Italian actress, singer and television personality.

Life and career
Born in Naples, Laurito debuted at a very young age entering the stage company of Eduardo De Filippo. She obtained large popularity with Renzo Arbore's variety show Quelli della notte, and then went on to host several TV-programs, including two editions of the RAI Saturday night show Fantastico. In 1989 she entered the Sanremo Music Festival with the song "Il babà è una cosa seria", ranking twelfth. Laurito is also author of several cookbooks.

Selected filmography
 Perdutamente tuo... mi firmo Macaluso Carmelo fu Giuseppe (1976) 
 L'Italia s'è rotta (1976) 
 The Payoff (1978) 
 Gegè Bellavita (1978)
 Odds and Evens (1978)
 Café Express (1980)   
 La pagella (1980)   
 A tu per tu (1984) 
 Il mistero di Bellavista (1985) 
 Il tenente dei carabinieri (1986) 
 Terra Nova (1991)
 W gli sposi (2019)
 I fratelli De Filippo (2021)

References

External links 

1951 births
Living people
Musicians from Naples
Italian comedy musicians
Italian film actresses
Italian television personalities
Italian stage actresses
Italian women singers